Cape Town, nicknamed the Mother City, is South Africa's oldest city. It serves as the country's legislative capital, being the seat of its Parliament. It is the country's second-largest city (after Johannesburg) and the largest in the Western Cape. The city is part of the City of Cape Town metropolitan municipality.

The city is known for its harbour, for its natural setting in the Cape Floristic Region, and for landmarks such as Table Mountain and Cape Point. In 2014, Cape Town was named the best place in the world to visit by The New York Times and similarly by The Daily Telegraph, in 2016.

Located on the shore of Table Bay, the City Bowl area of Cape Town, is the oldest urban area in the Western Cape, with a significant cultural heritage. It was founded by the Dutch East India Company (VOC) as a supply station for Dutch ships sailing to East Africa, India, and the Far East. Jan van Riebeeck's arrival on 6 April 1652 established the VOC Cape Colony, the first permanent European settlement in South Africa. Cape Town outgrew its original purpose as the first European outpost at the Castle of Good Hope, becoming the economic and cultural hub of the Cape Colony. Until the Witwatersrand Gold Rush and the development of Johannesburg, Cape Town was the largest city in southern Africa.

The city has a long coastline on the Atlantic Ocean, which includes False Bay, and extends to the Hottentots Holland mountains in the East. The Table Mountain National Park is within the city boundaries and there are several other nature reserves and marine protected areas within and adjacent to the city, protecting the diverse terrestrial and marine natural environment.

History

Early period

The earliest known remnants of human occupation in the region were found at Peers Cave in Fish Hoek and date to between 15,000 and 12,000 years ago. Little is known of the history of the region's first residents, since there is no written history from the area before it was first mentioned by Portuguese explorer Bartolomeu Dias. Dias, the first European to reach the area, arrived in 1488 and named it "Cape of Storms". It was later renamed by John II of Portugal as "Cape of Good Hope" because of the great optimism engendered by the opening of a sea route to the Indian subcontinent and East Indies. In 1497 the Portuguese explorer Vasco da Gama recorded a sighting of the Cape of Good Hope. In 1510, at the Battle of Salt River, the Portuguese admiral Francisco de Almeida and sixty-four of his men were killed and his party were defeated by the !Uriǁ’aekua ("Goringhaiqua" in Dutch approximate spelling) using specially trained cattle. The !Uriǁ’aekua were one of the so-called Khoekhoe clans who inhabited the area. In the late 16th century French, Danish, Dutch and English, but mainly Portuguese, ships regularly continued to stop over in Table Bay en route to the Indies. They traded tobacco, copper, and iron with the Khoekhoe clans of the region to exchange fresh meat and other provisions.

Dutch period

In 1652, Jan van Riebeeck and other employees of the United East India Company (VOC) were sent to the Cape Town to establish a way-station for ships travelling to the Dutch East Indies, and the Fort de Goede Hoop (later replaced by the Castle of Good Hope). The settlement grew slowly during this period, as it was hard to find adequate labour. This labour shortage prompted the authorities to import slaves from Indonesia and Madagascar. Many of these became some of the ancestors of the first Cape Coloured communities. Under Van Riebeeck and his successors as VOC commanders and later governors at the Cape, a wide range of agricultural plants were introduced to the Cape. Some of these, including grapes, cereals, ground nuts, potatoes, apples and citrus, had an important and lasting influence on the societies and economies of the region.

British period

The Dutch Republic being transformed into Revolutionary France's vassal Batavian Republic, Great Britain moved to take control of its colonies including the colonial possessions of the VOC. Britain captured Cape Town in 1795, but the Cape was returned to the Dutch by treaty in 1803. British forces occupied the Cape again in 1806 following the Battle of Blaauwberg when the successor state to the Batavian Republic, the Kingdom of Holland, allied with France during the Napoleonic Wars. In the Anglo-Dutch Treaty of 1814, Cape Town was permanently ceded to the United Kingdom. It became the capital of the newly formed Cape Colony, whose territory expanded very substantially through the 1800s. With expansion came calls for greater independence from the UK, with the Cape attaining its own parliament (1854) and a locally accountable Prime Minister (1872). Suffrage was established according to the non-racial Cape Qualified Franchise.

During the 1850s and 1860s additional plant species were introduced from Australia by the British authorities. Notably rooikrans to stabilise the sand of the Cape Flats to allow for a road connecting the peninsula with the rest of the African continent and eucalyptus to drain marshes. In 1859 the first railway line was built by the Cape Government Railways and a system of railways rapidly expanded in the 1870s. The discovery of diamonds in Griqualand West in 1867, and the Witwatersrand Gold Rush in 1886, prompted a flood of immigrants to South Africa. In 1895 the city's first public power station, the Graaff Electric Lighting Works, was opened.

Conflicts between the Boer republics in the interior and the British colonial government resulted in the Second Boer War of 1899–1902, which Britain won allowing for the formation of a united South Africa. From 1891 to 1901, the city's population more than doubled from 67,000 to 171,000. As the 19th century came to an end, the economic and political dominance of Cape Town in the Southern Africa region during the 19th century started to gave way to the dominance of Johannesburg and Pretoria in the 20th century.

South African period
In 1910, Britain established the Union of South Africa, which unified the Cape Colony with the two defeated Boer Republics and the British colony of Natal. Cape Town became the legislative capital of the Union, and later of the Republic of South Africa. By the time of the 1936 census Johannesburg had overtaken Cape Town as the largest city in the country.

Apartheid era 

Prior to the mid-twentieth century, Cape Town was one of the most racially integrated cities in the South Africa. In the 1948 national elections, the National Party won on a platform of apartheid (racial segregation) under the slogan of "swart gevaar" (Afrikaans for "black danger"). This led to the erosion and eventual abolition of the Cape's multiracial franchise, as well as to the Group Areas Act, which classified all areas according to race. Formerly multi-racial suburbs of Cape Town were either purged of residents deemed unlawful by apartheid legislation or demolished. The most infamous example of this in Cape Town was District Six. After it was declared a whites-only region in 1965, all housing there was demolished and over 60,000 residents were forcibly removed. Many of these residents were relocated to the Cape Flats.

The earliest of the Cape Flats forced removals were to Langa particularly with the 1923 Native Urban Areas Act. Langa is the oldest township in Cape Town and the scene of much resistance against Apartheid. Its origins go back to the 19th century. Under apartheid, the Cape was considered a "Coloured labour preference area", to the exclusion of "Bantus", i.e. Africans. The implementation of this policy was widely opposed by trade unions, civil society and opposition parties. It is notable that this policy was not advocated for by any coloured political group, and its implementation was a unilateral decision by the apartheid government. School students from Langa, Gugulethu and Nyanga in Cape Town reacted to the news of protests against Bantu Education in Soweto in June 1976 and organised gatherings and marches, which were met with resistance from the police. A number of school buildings were burnt down.

Cape Town was home to many leaders of the anti-apartheid movement. On Robben Island, a former penitentiary island  from the city, many famous political prisoners were held for years. In one of the most famous moments marking the end of apartheid, Nelson Mandela made his first public speech since his imprisonment, from the balcony of Cape Town City Hall hours after being released on 11 February 1990. His speech heralded the beginning of a new era for the country, and the first democratic election, was held four years later, on 27 April 1994. Nobel Square in the Victoria & Alfred Waterfront features statues of South Africa's four Nobel Peace Prize winners: Albert Luthuli, Desmond Tutu, F. W. de Klerk and Nelson Mandela.

Post-apartheid era 
There was a severe water shortage from 2015 to 2018. Since the beginning of the second decade of the twenty-first century Cape Town and the Western Cape province have been home to a growing independence movement. In the 2021 municipal elections Cape independence parties garnered around 5% of the city's vote.

Geography and the natural environment

A thin strip of cloud, known colloquially as the "tablecloth" ("Karos" in Afrikaans), sometimes forms on top of the mountain. To the immediate south, the Cape Peninsula is a scenic mountainous spine jutting  southward into the Atlantic Ocean and terminating at Cape Point. There are over 70 peaks above  within Cape Town's official city limits. The Cape Town region is characterised by an extensive coastline, rugged mountain ranges, coastal plains and inland valleys.

Extent 
The extent of Cape Town has varied considerably over time. It originated as a small settlement at the foot of Table Mountain and has grown beyond its city limits as a metropolitan area to encompass the entire Cape Peninsula to the south, the Cape Flats, the Helderberg basin and part of the Steenbras catchment area to the east, and the Tygerberg hills, Blouberg and other areas to the north. Robben Island in Table Bay is also part of Cape Town. It is bounded by the Atlantic Ocean to the west, and False Bay to the south. To the north and east, the extent is demarcated by boundaries of neighbouring municipalities within the Western Cape province.

The Cape Peninsula is 52 km long from Mouille Point in the north to Cape Point in the south, with an area of about 470 km2, and it displays more topographical variety than other similar sized areas in southern Africa, and consequently spectacular scenery. There are diverse low-nutrient soils, large rocky outcrops, scree slopes, a mainly rocky coastline with embayed beaches, and considerable local variation in climatic conditions. The sedimentary rocks of the Cape Supergroup, of which parts of the Graafwater and Peninsula Formations remain, were uplifted between 280 and 21S million years ago, and were largely eroded away during the Mesozoic. The region was geologically stable during the Tertiary, which has led to slow denudation of the durable sandstones. Erosion rate and drainage has been influenced by fault lines and fractures, leaving remnant steep-sided massifs like Table Mountain surrounded by flatter slopes of deposits of the eroded material overlaying the older rocks,

There are two internationally notable landmarks, Table Mountain and Cape Point, at opposite ends of the Peninsula Mountain Chain, with the Cape Flats and False Bay to the east and the Atlantic Ocean to the west. The landscape is dominated by sandstone plateaux and ridges, which generally drop steeply at their margins to the surrounding debris slopes, interrupted by a major gap at the Fish Hoek–Noordhoek valley. In the south much of the area is a low sandstone plateau with sand dunes. Maximum altitude is 1113 m on Table Mountain. The Cape Flats (Afrikaans: Kaapse Vlakte) is a flat, low-lying, sandy area, area to the east the Cape Peninsula, and west of the Helderberg much of which was wetland and dunes within recent history. To the north are the Tygerberg hills and the Stellenbosch district.

The Helderberg area of Cape Town, previously known as the "Hottentots-Holland" area, is mostly residential, but also a wine-producing area east of the Cape Flats, west of the Hottentots Holland mountain range and south of the Helderberg mountain, from which it gets its current name. The Helderberg consists of the previous municipalities of Somerset West, Strand, Gordons Bay and a few other towns. Industry and commerce is largely in service of the area. After the Cape Peninsula, Helderberg is the next most mountainous part of Cape Town, bordered to the north and east by the highest peaks in the region along the watershed of the Helderberg and Hottentots Holland Mountains, which are part of the Cape Fold Belt with Cape Supergroup strata on a basement of Tygerberg Formation rocks intruded by part of the Stellenbosch granite pluton. The region includes the entire catchment of the Lourens and Sir Lowry's rivers, separated by the Schapenberg hill, and a small part of the catchment of the Eerste River to the west. The Helderberg is ecologically highly diverse, rivaling the Cape Peninsula, and has its own enndemic ecoregions and several conservation areas.

To the east of the Hottentots Holland mountains is the valley of the Steenbras River, in which the Steenbras Dam was built as a water supply for Cape Town. The dam has been supplemented by several other dams around the western Cape, some of them considerably larger. This is almost entirely a conservation area, of high biodiversity. Tygerberg hills, Blouberg hill, Durbanville are a few of the suburbs that make up the northern areas of Cape Town. In current popular culture these areas are often referred to as being beyond the "boerewors curtain," a play on the term "iron curtain."

UNESCO declared Robben Island in the Western Cape a World Heritage Site in 1999. Robben Island has been used as a prison where people were isolated, banished, and exiled for nearly 400 years. It was also used as a leper colony, a post office, a grazing ground, a mental hospital, and an outpost.

Geology

The Cape Peninsula is a rocky and mountainous peninsula that juts out into the Atlantic Ocean at the south-western extremity of the continent. At its tip is Cape Point and the Cape of Good Hope. The peninsula forms the west side of False Bay and the Cape Flats. On the east side are the Helderberg and Hottentots Holland mountains. The three main rock formations are the late-Precambrian Malmebury group (sedimentary and metamorphic rock), the Cape Granite suit, comprising the huge Peninsula, Kuilsrivier-Helderberg, and Stellenbosch batholiths, that were intruded into the Malmesbury Group about 630 million years ago, and the Table Mountain group sandstones that were deposited on the eroded surface of the granite and Malmesbury series basement about 450 million years ago. The sand, silt and mud deposits were lithified by pressure and then folded during the Cape Orogeny to form the Cape Fold Belt, which extends in an arc along the western and southern coasts. The present landscape is due to prolonged erosion having carved out deep valleys, removing parts of the once continuous Table Mountain Group sandstone cover from over the Cape Flats and False Bay, and leaving high residual mountain ridges.

At times the sea covered the Cape Flats and Noordhoek valley and the Cape Peninsula was then a group of islands. During glacial periods the sea level dropped to expose the bottom of False Bay to weathering and erosion, with the last major regression leaving the entire bottom of False Bay exposed. During this period an extensive system of dunes was formed on the sandy floor of False Bay. At this time the drainage outlets lay between Rocky Bank Cape Point to the west, and between Rocky Bank and Hangklip Ridge to the east, with the watershed roughly along the line of the contact zone east of Seal Island and Whittle Rock.

Climate

Cape Town has a warm Mediterranean climate (Köppen: Csb),
with mild, moderately wet winters and dry, warm summers. Winter, which lasts from the beginning of June to the end of August, may see large cold fronts entering for limited periods from the Atlantic Ocean with significant precipitation and strong north-westerly winds.
The region can get uncomfortably hot when the Berg Wind, meaning "mountain wind", blows from the Karoo interior. Spring and summer generally feature a strong wind from the south-east, known locally as the south- or the Cape Doctor, so called because it blows air pollution away. This wind is caused by a persistent high-pressure system over the South Atlantic to the west of Cape Town, known as the South Atlantic High, which shifts latitude seasonally, following the sun, and influencing the strength of the fronts and their northward reach. Cape Town receives about 3,100 hours of sunshine per year.

Unlike other parts of the country the city does not have many thunderstorms, and most of those that do occur, happen around October to December and March to April.

Climate change 
A 2019 paper published in PLOS One estimated that under Representative Concentration Pathway 4.5, a "moderate" scenario of climate change where global warming reaches ~ by 2100, the climate of Cape Town in the year 2050 would most closely resemble the current climate of Perth in Australia.

Moreover, according to the 2022 IPCC Sixth Assessment Report, Cape Town is one of 12 major African cities (Abidjan, Alexandria, Algiers, Cape Town, Casablanca, Dakar, Dar es Salaam, Durban, Lagos, Lomé, Luanda and Maputo) which would be the most severely affected by future sea level rise. It estimates that they would collectively sustain cumulative damages of USD 65 billion under RCP 4.5 and USD 86.5 billion for the high-emission scenario RCP 8.5 by the year 2050. Additionally, RCP 8.5 combined with the hypothetical impact from marine ice sheet instability at high levels of warming would involve up to 137.5 billion USD in damages, while the additional accounting for the "low-probability, high-damage events" may increase aggregate risks to USD 187 billion for the "moderate" RCP4.5, USD 206 billion for RCP8.5 and USD 397 billion under the high-end ice sheet instability scenario. Since sea level rise would continue for about 10,000 years under every scenario of climate change, future costs of sea level rise would only increase, especially without adaptation measures.

Hydrology

Sea surface temperatures 

Cape Town's coastal water ranges from cold to mild, and the difference between the two sides of the peninsula can be dramatic.

In summer False Bay is thermally stratified, with a vertical temperature variation of 5 to 9˚C between the warmer surface water and cooler depths below 50 m, while in winter the water column is at nearly constant temperature at all depths. The development of a thermocline is strongest around late December and peaks in late summer to early autumn. In summer the south easterly winds generate a zone of upwelling near Cape Hangklip, where surface water temperatures can be 6 to 7 °C colder than the surrounding areas, and bottom temperatures below 12 °C.

In the summer to early autumn (January–March), cold water upwelling near Cape Hangklip causes a strong surface temperature gradient between the south-western and north-eastern corners of the bay. In winter the surface temperature tends to be much the same everywhere. In the northern sector surface temperature varies a bit more (13 to 22 °C) than in the south (14 to 20 °C) during the year.

Surface temperature variation from year to year is linked to the El Niño–Southern Oscillation. During El Niño years the South Atlantic high is shifted, reducing the south-easterly winds, so upwelling and evaporative cooling are reduced and sea surface temperatures throughout the bay are warmer, while in La Niña years there is more wind and upwelling and consequently lower temperatures. Surface water heating during El Niño increases vertical stratification. The relationship is not linear. Occasionally eddies from the Agulhas current will bring warmer water and vagrant sea life carried from the south and east coasts into False Bay.

Flora and fauna

Located in a Conservation International biodiversity hotspot as well as the unique Cape Floristic Region, the city of Cape Town has one of the highest levels of biodiversity of any equivalent area in the world. These protected areas are a World Heritage Site, and an estimated 2,200 species of plants are confined to Table Mountain – more than exist in the whole of the United Kingdom which has 1200 plant species and 67 endemic plant species. Many of these species, including a great many types of proteas, are endemic to the mountain and can be found nowhere else.

It is home to a total of 19 different vegetation types, of which several are endemic to the city and occur nowhere else in the world.
It is also the only habitat of hundreds of endemic species, and hundreds of others which are severely restricted or threatened. This enormous species diversity is mainly because the city is uniquely located at the convergence point of several different soil types and micro-climates.

Table Mountain has an unusually rich biodiversity. Its vegetation consists predominantly of several different types of the unique and rich Cape Fynbos. The main vegetation type is endangered Peninsula Sandstone Fynbos, but critically endangered Peninsula Granite Fynbos, Peninsula Shale Renosterveld and Afromontane forest occur in smaller portions on the mountain.

Unfortunately, rapid population growth and urban sprawl has covered much of these ecosystems with development. Consequently, Cape Town now has over 300 threatened plant species and 13 which are now extinct. The Cape Peninsula, which lies entirely within the city of Cape Town, has the highest concentration of threatened species of any continental area of equivalent size in the world.
Tiny remnant populations of critically endangered or near extinct plants sometimes survive on road sides, pavements and sports fields. The remaining ecosystems are partially protected through a system of over 30 nature reserves – including the massive Table Mountain National Park.

Cape Town reached first place in the 2019 iNaturalist City Nature Challenge in two out of the three categories: Most Observations, and Most Species. This was the first entry by Capetonians in this annual competition to observe and record the local biodiversity over a four-day long weekend during what is considered the worst time of the year for local observations. A worldwide survey suggested that the extinction rate of endemic plants from the City of Cape Town is one of the highest in the world, at roughly three per year since 1900 – partly a consequence of the very small and localised habitats and high endemicity.

Government

Cape Town is governed by a 231-member city council elected in a system of mixed-member proportional representation. The city is divided into 116 wards, each of which elects a councillor by first-past-the-post voting. The remaining 115 councillors are elected from party lists so that the total number of councillors for each party is proportional to the number of votes received by that party.

In the 2021 Municipal Elections, the Democratic Alliance (DA) kept its majority, this time diminished, taking 136 seats. The African National Congress lost substantially, receiving 43 of the seats. The Democratic Alliance candidate for the Cape Town mayoralty, Geordin Hill-Lewis was elected mayor.

International relations
Cape Town has nineteen active sister city agreements

 Aachen, Germany
 Accra, Ghana
 Atlanta, United States of America
 Buenos Aires, Argentina
 Bujumbura, Burundi
 Dubai, United Arab Emirates
 Haifa, Israel
 Hangzhou, China
 Houston, United States of America
 Huangshan, China
 Izmir, Turkey
 Los Angeles, United States of America
 Malmö, Sweden
 Miami-Dade County, United States of America
 Monterrey, Mexico
 Munich, Germany
 Rio de Janeiro, Brazil
 Shenzhen, China
 Varna, Bulgaria
 Wuhan, China

2022 invasion of Ukraine 

The City of Cape Town has expressed explicit support for Ukraine during the 2022 invasion of the country by Russia. To show this support the City of Cape Town lit up the Old City Hall in the colours of the Ukrainian flag on 2 March 2022. This has differentiated the city from the officially neutral foreign policy position taken by the South African national government.

Demographics

According to the South African National Census of 2011, the population of the City of Cape Town metropolitan municipalityan area that includes suburbs and exurbs is 3,740,026 people. This represents an annual growth rate of 2.6% compared to the results of the previous census in 2001 which found a population of 2,892,243 people.
 Of those residents who were asked about their first language, 35.7% spoke Afrikaans, 29.8% spoke Xhosa and 28.4% spoke English. 24.8% of the population is under the age of 15, while 5.5% is 65 or older. The sex ratio is 96, meaning that there are slightly more women than men.

Of those residents aged 20 or older, 1.8% have no schooling, 8.1% have some schooling but did not finish primary school, 4.6% finished primary school but have no secondary schooling, 38.9% have some secondary schooling but did not finish Grade 12, 29.9% finished Grade 12 but have no higher education, and 16.7% have higher education. Overall, 46.6% have at least a Grade 12 education. Of those aged between 5 and 25, 67.8% are attending an educational institution. Amongst those aged between 15 and 65 the unemployment rate is 23.7%. The average annual household income is R161,762.

The total number of households grew from 653,085 in 1996 to 1,068,572 in 2011, which represents an increase of 63.6%. The average number of household members declined from 3,92 in 1996 to 3,50 in 2011. Of those households, 78.4% are in formal structures (houses or flats), while 20.5% are in informal structures (shacks). 97.3% of City-supplied households have access to electricity, and 94.0% of households use electricity for lighting. 87.3% of households have piped water to the dwelling, while 12.0% have piped water through a communal tap. 94.9% of households have regular refuse collection service. 91.4% of households have a flush toilet or chemical toilet, while 4.5% still use a bucket toilet. 82.1% of households have a refrigerator, 87.3% have a television and 70.1% have a radio. Only 34.0% have a landline telephone, but 91.3% have a cellphone. 37.9% have a computer, and 49.3% have access to the Internet (either through a computer or a cellphone).

In 2011 over 70% of cross provincial South African migrants coming into the Western Cape settled in Cape Town; 53.64% of South African migrants into the Western Cape came from the Eastern Cape and 20.95% came from Gauteng province.

According to the 2016 City of Cape Town community survey, there were 4,004,793 people in the City of Cape Town metro. Out of this population, 42.6% identified as Black African, 39.9% identified as Coloured, 16.5% identified as White and 1.1% identified as Asian.

Since the outbreak of the COVID-19 pandemic in South Africa the South African media has reported that increasing numbers of wealthy and middle class South Africans have started moving from inland areas of South Africa to coastal regions of the country, most notably Cape Town, in a phenomenon referred to as "semigration." Declining municipal services in the rest of the country and the South African energy crisis are other cited reasons for semigration.

The city's population is expected to grow by an additional 400,000 residents between 2020 and 2025 with 76% of those new residents falling into the low-income bracket earning less than R13,000 a month.

Religion

In the 2015 General Household Survey 82.3% of respondents self identified as Christian, 8% as Muslim, 3.8% as following a traditional African religion and 3.1% as "nothing in particular."

Most places of worship in the city are Christian churches and cathedrals: Zion Christian Church, Apostolic Faith Mission of South Africa, Assemblies of God, Baptist Union of Southern Africa (Baptist World Alliance), Methodist Church of Southern Africa (World Methodist Council), Anglican Church of Southern Africa (Anglican Communion), Presbyterian Church of Africa (World Communion of Reformed Churches), Roman Catholic Archdiocese of Cape Town (Catholic Church), the Orthodox Archbishopric of Good Hope (Greek Orthodox Cathedral of St George) and the Church of Jesus Christ of Latter-day Saints (LDS Church). The LDS Church announced 4 April 2021 the construction of a temple with groundbreaking dates yet to be announced. Islam is the city's second largest religion with a long history in Cape Town, resulting in a number of mosques and other Muslim religious sites spread across the city, such as the Auwal Mosque, South Africa's first mosque. Cape Town's significant Jewish population supports a number of synagogues most notably the historic Gardens Shul. The Cape Town Progressive Jewish Congregation also has three temples in the city. Other religious sites in the city include Hindu, Buddhist and Baháʼí temples.

Crime

In recent years, the city has struggled with drugs, a surge in violent drug-related crime and more recently gang violence. In the Cape Flats alone, there were approximately 100,000 people in over 130 different gangs in 2018. While there are some alliances, this multitude and division is also cause for conflict between groups. At the same time, the economy has grown due to the boom in the tourism and the real estate industries. Since July 2019 widespread violent crime in poorer gang dominated areas of greater Cape Town has resulted in an ongoing military presence in these neighbourhoods. Cape Town had the highest murder rate among large South African cities at 77 murders per 100,000 people in the period April 2018 to March 2019, with 3157 murders mostly occurring in poor townships created under the apartheid regime. toll. In 2022 the Mexican Council for Public Security and Criminal Justice ranked Cape Town as one of the 50 most violent cities in the world.

Economy

The city is South Africa's second main economic centre and Africa's third main economic hub city. It serves as the regional manufacturing centre in the Western Cape. In 2019 the city's GMP of R489 billion (US$33.04 billion) represented 71.1% of the Western Cape's total GRP and 9.6% of South Africa's total GDP; the city also accounted for 11.1% of all employed people in the country and had a citywide GDP per capita of R111,364 (US$7,524). Since the global financial crisis of 2007 the city's economic growth rate has mirrored South Africa's decline in growth whilst the population growth rate for the city has remained steady at around 2% a year. Around 80% of the city's economic activity is generated by the tertiary sector of the economy with the finance, retail, real-estate, food and beverage industries being the four largest contributors to the city's economic growth rate.

In 2008 the city was named as the most entrepreneurial city in South Africa, with the percentage of Capetonians pursuing business opportunities almost three times higher than the national average. Those aged between 18 and 64 were 190% more likely to pursue new business, whilst in Johannesburg, the same demographic group was only 60% more likely than the national average to pursue a new business.

With the highest number of successful information technology companies in Africa, Cape Town is an important centre for the industry on the continent. This includes an increasing number of companies in the space industry. Growing at an annual rate of 8.5% and an estimated worth of R77 billion in 2010, nationwide the high tech industry in Cape Town is becoming increasingly important to the city's economy. A number of entrepreneurship initiatives and universities hosting technology startups such as Jumo, Yoco, Aerobotics, Luno, Rain telecommunication and The Sun Exchange are located in the city.

The city has the largest film industry in the Southern Hemisphere generating R5 billion (US$476.19 million) in revenue and providing an estimated 6,058 direct and 2,502 indirect jobs in 2013. Much of the industry is based out of the Cape Town Film Studios.

Major companies 

Most companies headquartered in the city are insurance companies, retail groups, publishers, design houses, fashion designers, shipping companies, petrochemical companies, architects and advertising agencies. Some of the most notable companies headquartered in the city are food and fashion retailer Woolworths, supermarket chain Pick n Pay Stores and Shoprite, New Clicks Holdings Limited, fashion retailer Foschini Group, internet service provider MWEB, Mediclinic International, eTV, multinational mass media giant Naspers, and financial services giant Sanlam and Old Mutual Park.

Other notable companies include Belron, Ceres Fruit Juices, Coronation Fund Managers, Vida e Caffè, Capitec Bank. The city is a manufacturing base for several multinational companies including, Johnson & Johnson, GlaxoSmithKline, Levi Strauss & Co., Adidas, Bokomo Foods, Yoco and Nampak. Amazon Web Services maintains one of its largest facilities in the world in Cape Town with the city serving as the Africa headquarters for its parent company Amazon.

Inequality 
The city of Cape Town's Gini coefficient of 0.58 is lower than South Africa's Gini coefficient of 0.7 making it more equal than the rest of the country or any other major South Africa city although still highly unequal by international standards. Between 2001 and 2010 the city's Gini coefficient, a measure of inequality, improved by dropping from 0.59 in 2007 to 0.57 in 2010 only to increase to 0.58 by 2017.

Tourism

The Western Cape is a highly important tourist region in South Africa; the tourism industry accounts for 9.8% of the GDP of the province and employs 9.6% of the province's workforce. In 2010, over 1.5 million international tourists visited the area. Cape Town is not only a popular international tourist destination in South Africa, but Africa as a whole. This is due to its mild climate, natural setting, and well-developed infrastructure. The city has several well-known natural features that attract tourists, most notably Table Mountain, which forms a large part of the Table Mountain National Park and is the back end of the City Bowl. Reaching the top of the mountain can be achieved either by hiking up, or by taking the Table Mountain Cableway. Cape Point is the dramatic headland at the end of the Cape Peninsula. Many tourists also drive along Chapman's Peak Drive, a narrow road that links Noordhoek with Hout Bay, for the views of the Atlantic Ocean and nearby mountains. It is possible to either drive or hike up Signal Hill for closer views of the City Bowl and Table Mountain.

Many tourists also visit Cape Town's beaches, which are popular with local residents. It is possible to visit several different beaches in the same day, each with a different setting and atmosphere.
Both coasts are popular, although the beaches in affluent Clifton and elsewhere on the Atlantic Coast are better developed with restaurants and cafés, with a strip of restaurants and bars accessible to the beach at Camps Bay. The Atlantic seaboard, known as Cape Town's Riviera, is regarded as one of the most scenic routes in South Africa, along the slopes of the Twelve Apostles to the boulders and white sand beaches of Llandudno, with the route ending in Hout Bay, a diverse suburb with a fishing and recreational boating harbour near a small island with a breeding colony of African fur seals. This suburb is also accessible by road from the Constantia valley over the mountains to the northeast, and via the picturesque Chapman's Peak drive from the residential suburb Noordhoek in the Fish Hoek valley to the south-east. Boulders Beach near Simon's Town is known for its colony of African penguins.

The city has several notable cultural attractions. The Victoria & Alfred Waterfront, built on top of part of the docks of the Port of Cape Town, is the city's most visited tourist attraction. It is also one of the city's most popular shopping venues, with several hundred shops as well as the Two Oceans Aquarium. The V&A also hosts the Nelson Mandela Gateway, through which ferries depart for Robben Island. It is possible to take a ferry from the V&A to Hout Bay, Simon's Town and the Cape fur seal colonies on Seal and Duiker Islands. Several companies offer tours of the Cape Flats, a region of mostly Coloured townships, and Khayelitsha, a mostly black township.

The most popular areas for visitors to stay include Camps Bay, Sea Point, the V&A Waterfront, the City Bowl, Hout Bay, Constantia, Rondebosch, Newlands, and Somerset West. In November 2013, Cape Town was voted the best global city in The Daily Telegraph's annual Travel Awards. Cape Town offers tourists a range of air, land and sea-based adventure activities, including helicopter rides, paragliding and skydiving, snorkelling and scuba diving, boat trips, game-fishing, hiking, mountain biking and rock climbing. Surfing is popular and the city hosts the Red Bull Big Wave Africa surfing competition every year, and there is some local and international recreational scuba tourism.

The City of Cape Town works closely with Cape Town Tourism to promote the city both locally and internationally. The primary focus of Cape Town Tourism is to represent Cape Town as a tourist destination. Cape Town Tourism receives a portion of its funding from the City of Cape Town while the remainder is made up of membership fees and own-generated funds. The Tristan da Cunha government owns and operates a lodging facility in Cape Town which charges discounted rates to Tristan da Cunha residents and non-resident natives. Cape Town's transport system links it to the rest of South Africa; it serves as the gateway to other destinations within the province. The Cape Winelands and in particular the towns of Stellenbosch, Paarl and Franschhoek are popular day trips from the city for sightseeing and wine tasting.

Infrastructure and services 
Most goods are handled through the Port of Cape Town or Cape Town International Airport. Most major shipbuilding companies have offices in Cape Town. The province is also a centre of energy development for the country, with the existing Koeberg nuclear power station providing energy for the Western Cape's needs.

Cape Town has four major commercial nodes, with Cape Town Central Business District containing the majority of job opportunities and office space. Century City, the Bellville/Tygervalley strip and Claremont commercial nodes are well established and contain many offices and corporate headquarters.

Health

The Alexandra Hospital is a specialist mental health care hospital in Cape Town, it provides care for complex mental health issues and intellectual disability.
Groote Schuur Hospital is a large, government-funded, teaching hospital situated on the slopes of Devil's Peak. It was founded in 1938 and is famous for being the institution where the first human-to-human heart transplant took place. Groote Schuur is the chief academic hospital of the University of Cape Town's medical school, providing tertiary care and instruction in all the major branches of medicine. The hospital underwent major extension in 1984 when two new wings were added.
The Hottentots Holland Hospital, also known as Helderberg Hospital, is a district hospital for the Helderberg basin located in Somerset West, and also serves surrounding areas in the Overberg district.
Vergelegen Medi-clinic – Private hospital in Somerset West

Education

Public primary and secondary schools in Cape Town are run by the Western Cape Education Department. This provincial department is divided into seven districts; four of these are "Metropole" districts – Metropole Central, North, South, and East – which cover various areas of the city. There are also many private schools, both religious and secular. Cape Town has a well-developed higher system of public universities. Cape Town is served by three public universities: the University of Cape Town (UCT), the University of the Western Cape (UWC) and the Cape Peninsula University of Technology (CPUT). Stellenbosch University, while not based in the city itself, has its main campus and administrative section 50 kilometres from the City Bowl and has additional campuses, such as the Tygerberg Faculty of Medicine and Health Sciences and the Bellville Business Park within the city.

Both the University of Cape Town and Stellenbosch University are leading universities in South Africa. This is due in large part to substantial financial contributions made to these institutions by both the public and private sector. UCT is an English-language tuition institution. It has over 21,000 students and has an MBA programme that was ranked 51st by the Financial Times in 2006. It is also the top-ranked university in Africa, being the only African university to make the world's Top 200 university list at number 146. Since the African National Congress has become the country's ruling party, some restructuring of Western Cape universities has taken place and as such, traditionally non-white universities have seen increased financing, which has evidently benefitted the University of the Western Cape.

The Cape Peninsula University of Technology was formed on 1 January 2005, when two separate institutions – Cape Technikon and Peninsula Technikon – were merged. The new university offers education primarily in English, although one may take courses in any of South Africa's official languages. The institution generally awards the National Diploma. Students from the universities and high schools are involved in the South African SEDS, Students for the Exploration and Development of Space. This is the South African SEDS, and there are many SEDS branches in other countries, preparing enthusiastic students and young professionals for the growing Space industry. As well as the Universities, there are also several colleges in and around Cape Town. Including the College of Cape Town, False Bay College and Northlink College. Many students use NSFAS funding to help pay for tertiary education at these TVET colleges. Cape Town has also become a popular study abroad destination for many international college students. Many study abroad providers offer semester, summer, short-term, and internship programs in partnership with Cape Town universities as a chance for international students to gain intercultural understanding.

Water supply

Water crisis of 2017 to 2018

The Cape Town water crisis of 2017 to 2018 was a period of severe water shortage in the Western Cape region, most notably affecting the City of Cape Town. While dam water levels had been declining since 2015, the Cape Town water crisis peaked during mid-2017 to mid-2018 when water levels hovered between 15 and 30 percent of total dam capacity.

In late 2017, there were first mentions of plans for "Day Zero", a shorthand reference for the day when the water level of the major dams supplying the city could fall below 13.5 percent. "Day Zero" would mark the start of Level 7 water restrictions, when municipal water supplies would be largely switched off and it was envisioned that residents could have to queue for their daily ration of water. If this had occurred, it would have made the City of Cape Town the first major city in the world to run out of water.

The city of Cape Town implemented significant water restrictions in a bid to curb water usage, and succeeded in reducing its daily water usage by more than half to around 500 million litres (130,000,000 US gal) per day in March 2018. The fall in water usage led the city to postpone its estimate for "Day Zero", and strong rains starting in June 2018 led to dam levels recovering. In September 2018, with dam levels close to 70 percent, the city began easing water restrictions, indicating that the worst of the water crisis was over. Good rains in 2020 effectively broke the drought and resulting water shortage when dam levels reached 95 percent.

Transport

Air 

Cape Town International Airport serves both domestic and international flights. It is the second-largest airport in South Africa and serves as a major gateway for travelers to the Cape region. Cape Town has regularly scheduled services to Southern Africa, East Africa, Mauritius, Middle East, Far East, Europe and the United States as well as eleven domestic destinations. Cape Town International Airport opened a brand new central terminal building that was developed to handle an expected increase in air traffic as tourism numbers increased in the lead-up to the tournament of the 2010 FIFA World Cup. Other renovations include several large new parking garages, a revamped domestic departure terminal, a new Bus Rapid Transit system station and a new double-decker road system. The airport's cargo facilities are also being expanded and several large empty lots are being developed into office space and hotels.

Cape Town is one of five internationally recognised Antarctic gateway cities with transportation connections. Since 2021, commercial flights have operated from Cape Town to Wolf's Fang Runway, Antarctica. The Cape Town International Airport was among the winners of the World Travel Awards for being Africa's leading airport. Cape Town International Airport is located 18 km from the Central Business District

Sea

Cape Town has a long tradition as a port city. The Port of Cape Town, the city's main port, is in Table Bay directly to the north of the CBD. The port is a hub for ships in the southern Atlantic: it is located along one of the busiest shipping corridors in the world, and acts as a stopover point for goods en route to or from Latin America and Asia. It is also an entry point into the South African market. It is the second-busiest container port in South Africa after Durban. In 2004, it handled 3,161 ships and 9.2 million tonnes of cargo.

Simon's Town Harbour on the False Bay coast of the Cape Peninsula is the main operational base of the South African Navy.

Until the 1970s the city was served by the Union Castle Line with service to the United Kingdom and St Helena. The RMS St Helena provided passenger and cargo service between Cape Town and St Helena until the opening of St Helena Airport.

The cargo vessel M/V Helena, under AW Shipping Management, takes a limited number of passengers, between Cape Town and St Helena and Ascension Island on its voyages. Multiple vessels also take passengers to and from Tristan da Cunha, inaccessible by aircraft, to and from Cape Town. In addition  takes passengers on its cargo service to the Canary Islands and Hamburg, Germany.

Rail

The Shosholoza Meyl is the passenger rail operations of Spoornet and operates two long-distance passenger rail services from Cape Town: a daily service to and from Johannesburg via Kimberley and a weekly service to and from Durban via Kimberley, Bloemfontein and Pietermaritzburg. These trains terminate at Cape Town railway station and make a brief stop at Bellville. Cape Town is also one terminus of the luxury tourist-oriented Blue Train as well as the five-star Rovos Rail.

Metrorail operates a commuter rail service in Cape Town and the surrounding area. The Metrorail network consists of 96 stations throughout the suburbs and outskirts of Cape Town.

Road
Cape Town is the origin of three national roads. The N1 and N2 begin in the foreshore area near the City Centre and the N7, which runs North toward Namibia. The N1 runs East-North-East through Edgemead, Parow, Bellville, and Brackenfell. It connects Cape Town to major cities further inland, namely Bloemfontein, Johannesburg, and Pretoria An older at-grade road, the R101, runs parallel to the N1 from Bellville. The N2 runs East-South-East through Rondebosch, Guguletu, Khayelitsha, Macassar to Somerset West. It becomes a multiple-carriageway, at-grade road from the intersection with the R44 onward. The N2 continues east along the coast, linking Cape Town to the coastal cities of Mossel Bay, George, Port Elizabeth, East London and Durban. An older at-grade road, the R101, runs parallel to the N1 initially, before veering south at Bellville, to join the N2 at Somerset West via the suburbs of Kuils River and Eerste River. The N7 originates from the N1 at Wingfield Interchange near Edgemead. It begins, initially as a highway, but becoming an at-grade road from the intersection with the M5 onward.

There are also a number of regional routes linking Cape Town with surrounding areas. The R27 originates from the N1 near the Foreshore and runs north parallel to the N7, but nearer to the coast. It passes through the suburbs of Milnerton, Table View and Bloubergstrand and links the city to the West Coast, ending at the town of Velddrif. The R44 enters the east of the metro from the north, from Stellenbosch. It connects Stellenbosch to Somerset West, then crosses the N2 to Strand and Gordon's Bay. It exits the metro heading south hugging the coast, leading to the towns of Betty's Bay and Kleinmond.

Of the three-digit routes, the R300 is an expressway linking the N1 at Brackenfell to the N2 near Mitchells Plain and the Cape Town International Airport. The R302 runs from the R102 in Bellville, heading north across the N1 through Durbanville leaving the metro to Malmesbury. The R304 enters the northern limits of the metro from Stellenbosch, running NNW before veering west to cross the N7 at Philadelphia to end at Atlantis at a junction with the R307. This R307 starts north of Koeberg from the R27 and, after meeting the R304, continues north to Darling. The R310 originates from Muizenberg and runs along the coast, to the south of Mitchell's Plain and Khayelitsha, before veering north-east, crossing the N2 west of Macassar, and exiting the metro heading to Stellenbosch.

Cape Town, like most South African cities, uses Metropolitan or "M" routes for important intra-city routes, a layer below National (N) roads and Regional (R) routes. Each city's M roads are independently numbered. Most are at-grade roads. The M3 splits from the N2 and runs to the south along the eastern slopes of Table Mountain, connecting the City Bowl with Muizenberg. Except for a section between Rondebosch and Newlands that has at-grade intersections, this route is a highway. The M5 splits from the N1 further east than the M3, and links the Cape Flats to the CBD. It is a highway as far as the interchange with the M68 at Ottery, before continuing as an at-grade road. Cape Town has the worst traffic congestion in South Africa.

Buses
Golden Arrow Bus Services operates scheduled bus services in the Cape Town metropolitan area. Several companies run long-distance bus services from Cape Town to the other cities in South Africa.

MyCiTi

Cape Town has a public transport system in about 10% of the city, running north to south along the west coastline of the city, comprising Phase 1 of the IRT system. This is known as the MyCiTi service.

MyCiTi Phase 1 includes services linking the Airport to the Cape Town inner city, as well as the following areas: Blouberg / Table View, Dunoon, Atlantis and Melkbosstrand, Milnerton, Paarden Eiland, Century City, Salt River and Walmer Estate, and all suburbs of the City Bowl and Atlantic Seaboard all the way to Llandudno and Hout Bay.

The MyCiTi N2 Express service consists of two routes each linking the Cape Town inner city and Khayelitsha and Mitchells Plain on the Cape Flats.

The service use high floor articulated and standard size buses in dedicated busways, low floor articulated and standard size buses on the N2 Express service, and smaller  Optare buses in suburban and inner city areas. It offers universal access through level boarding and numerous other measures, and requires cashless fare payment using the EMV compliant smart card system, called myconnect. Headway of services (i.e. the time between buses on the same route) range from three to twenty minutes in peak times to an hour in off-peak times.

Taxis

Cape Town has two kinds of taxis: metered taxis and minibus taxis. Unlike many cities, metered taxis are not allowed to drive around the city to solicit fares and instead must be called to a specific location.

Cape Town metered taxi cabs mostly operate in the city bowl, suburbs and Cape Town International Airport areas. Large companies that operate fleets of cabs can be reached by phone and are cheaper than the single operators that apply for hire from taxi ranks and Victoria and Alfred Waterfront. There are about one thousand meter taxis in Cape Town. Their rates vary from R8 per kilometre to about R15 per kilometre. The larger taxi companies in Cape Town are Excite Taxis, Cabnet and Intercab and single operators are reachable by cellular phone. The seven seated Toyota Avanza are the most popular with larger Taxi companies. Meter cabs are mostly used by tourists and are safer to use than minibus taxis.

Minibus taxis are the standard form of transport for the majority of the population who cannot afford private vehicles. Although essential, these taxis are often poorly maintained and are frequently not road-worthy. These taxis make frequent unscheduled stops to pick up passengers, which can cause accidents. With the high demand for transport by the working class of South Africa, minibus taxis are often filled over their legal passenger allowance. Minibuses are generally owned and operated in fleets.

Culture

Cape Town is noted for its architectural heritage, with the highest density of Cape Dutch style buildings in the world. Cape Dutch style, which combines the architectural traditions of the Netherlands, Germany, France and Indonesia, is most visible in Constantia, the old government buildings in the Central Business District, and along Long Street. The annual Cape Town Minstrel Carnival, also known by its Afrikaans name of Kaapse Klopse, is a large minstrel festival held annually on 2 January or "Tweede Nuwe Jaar" (Second New Year). Competing teams of minstrels parade in brightly coloured costumes, performing Cape Jazz, either carrying colourful umbrellas or playing an array of musical instruments. The Artscape Theatre Centre is the largest performing arts venue in Cape Town. The city was named the World Design Capital for 2014 by the International Council of Societies of Industrial Design.

The city also encloses the 36 hectare Kirstenbosch National Botanical Garden that contains protected natural forest and fynbos along with a variety of animals and birds. There are over 7,000 species in cultivation at Kirstenbosch, including many rare and threatened species of the Cape Floristic Region. In 2004 this Region, including Kirstenbosch, was declared a UNESCO World Heritage Site.

Whale watching is popular amongst tourists: southern right whales and humpback whales are seen off the coast during the breeding season (August to November) and Bryde's whales and orca can be seen any time of the year. The nearby town of Hermanus is known for its Whale Festival, but whales can also be seen in False Bay. Heaviside's dolphins are endemic to the area and can be seen from the coast north of Cape Town; dusky dolphins live along the same coast and can occasionally be seen from the ferry to Robben Island.

The only complete windmill in South Africa is Mostert's Mill, Mowbray. It was built in 1796 and restored in 1935 and again in 1995.

Cuisine

Food originating from or synonymous with Cape Town includes the savory sweet spiced meat dish Bobotie that dates from the 17th century. The Gatsby, a sandwich filled with slap chips and other toppings, was first served in 1976 in the suburb of Athlone and is also synonymous with the city. The koe'sister is a traditional Cape Malay pastry described as a cinnamon infused dumpling with a cake-like texture, finished off with a sprinkling of desiccated coconut. Malva pudding (sometimes known as Cape Malva pudding) is a sticky sweet desert often served with hot custard is also associated with the city and dates back to the 17th century. A related desert dish, Cape Brandy Pudding, is also associated with the city and surrounding region. Cape Town is also the home of the South African wine industry with the first wine produced in the country being bottled in the city; a number of notable wineries still exist in the city including Groot Constantia and Klein Constantia.

Media

Several newspapers, magazines and printing facilities have their offices in the city. Independent News and Media publishes the major English language papers in the city, the Cape Argus and the Cape Times. Naspers, the largest media conglomerate in South Africa, publishes Die Burger, the major Afrikaans language paper.

Cape Town has many local community newspapers. Some of the largest community newspapers in English are the Athlone News from Athlone, the Atlantic Sun, the Constantiaberg Bulletin from Constantiaberg, the City Vision from Bellville, the False Bay Echo from False Bay, the Helderberg Sun from Helderberg, the Plainsman from Michell's Plain, the Sentinel News from Hout Bay, the Southern Mail from the Southern Peninsula, the Southern Suburbs Tatler from the Southern Suburbs, Table Talk from Table View and Tygertalk from Tygervalley/Durbanville. Afrikaans language community newspapers include the Landbou-Burger and the Tygerburger.
Vukani, based in the Cape Flats, is published in Xhosa.

Cape Town is a centre for major broadcast media with several radio stations that only broadcast within the city. 94.5 Kfm (94.5 MHz FM) and Good Hope FM (94–97 MHz FM) mostly play pop music. Heart FM (104.9 MHz FM), the former P4 Radio, plays jazz and R&B, while Fine Music Radio (101.3 FM) plays classical music and jazz, and Magic Music Radio (828 kHz MW) plays adult contemporary and classic rock from the 60's, 70's, 80's, 90's and 00's. Bush Radio is a community radio station (89.5 MHz FM). The Voice of the Cape (95.8 MHz FM) and Cape Talk (567 kHz MW) are the major talk radio stations in the city. Bokradio (98.9 MHz FM) is an Afrikaans music station. The University of Cape Town also runs its own radio station, UCT Radio (104.5 MHz FM).

The SABC has a small presence in the city, with satellite studios located at Sea Point. e.tv has a greater presence, with a large complex located at Longkloof Studios in Gardens. M-Net is not well represented with infrastructure within the city. Cape Town TV is a local TV station, supported by numerous organisation and focusing mostly on documentaries. Numerous productions companies and their support industries are located in the city, mostly supporting the production of overseas commercials, model shoots, TV-series and movies. The local media infrastructure remains primarily in Johannesburg.

Sport and recreation

Cape Town's most popular sports by participation are cricket, association football, swimming, and rugby union. In rugby union, Cape Town is the home of the Western Province side, who play at Cape Town Stadium and compete in the Currie Cup. In addition, Western Province players (along with some from Wellington's Boland Cavaliers) comprise the Stormers in the United Rugby Championship competition. Cape Town has also been a host city for both the 1995 Rugby World Cup and 2010 FIFA World Cup, and annually hosts the Africa leg of the World Rugby 7s. It will also be host to the 2023 Netball World Cup.

Association football, which is also known as soccer in South Africa, is also popular. Two clubs from Cape Town play in the Premier Soccer League (PSL), South Africa's premier league. These teams are Ajax Cape Town, which formed as a result of the 1999 amalgamation of the Seven Stars and the Cape Town Spurs and resurrected Cape Town City F.C. Cape Town was also the location of several of the matches of the FIFA 2010 World Cup including a semi-final, held in South Africa. The Mother City built a new 70,000-seat stadium (Cape Town Stadium) in the Green Point area.

In cricket, the Cape Cobras represent Cape Town at the Newlands Cricket Ground. The team is the result of an amalgamation of the Western Province Cricket and Boland Cricket teams. They take part in the Supersport and Standard Bank Cup Series. The Newlands Cricket Ground regularly hosts international matches.

Cape Town has had Olympic aspirations. For example, in 1996, Cape Town was one of the five candidate cities shortlisted by the IOC to launch official candidatures to host the 2004 Summer Olympics. Although the Games ultimately went to Athens, Cape Town came in third place. There has been some speculation that Cape Town was seeking the South African Olympic Committee's nomination to be South Africa's bid city for the 2020 Summer Olympic Games. That was quashed when the International Olympic Committee awarded the 2020 Games to Tokyo.

The city of Cape Town has vast experience in hosting major national and international sports events. The Cape Town Cycle Tour is the world's largest individually timed road cycling race – and the first event outside Europe to be included in the International Cycling Union's Golden Bike series. It sees over 35,000 cyclists tackling a  route around Cape Town. The Absa Cape Epic is the largest full-service mountain bike stage race in the world. Some notable events hosted by Cape Town have included the 1995 Rugby World Cup, 2003 ICC Cricket World Cup, and World Championships in various sports such as athletics, fencing, weightlifting, hockey, cycling, canoeing, gymnastics and others. Cape Town was also a host city to the 2010 FIFA World Cup from 11 June to 11 July 2010, further enhancing its profile as a major events city. It was also one of the host cities of the 2009 Indian Premier League cricket tournament. The Mother City has also played host to the Africa leg of the annual World Rugby 7s event since 2015; for nine seasons, from 2002 until 2010, the event was staged in George in the Western Cape, before moving to Port Elizabeth for the 2011 edition, and then to Cape Town in 2015. The event usually takes place in mid-December, and is hosted at the iconic Cape Town Stadium in Green Point, perfectly set against the backdrop of the Atlantic Ocean and the unmistakable silhouette of Table Mountain.

There are several golf courses in Cape Town. The Clovelly Country Club and Metropolitan Golf Club are two of the best Golf Courses in Cape Town both offering superb views while playing the 18 holes.

The coastline of Cape Town is relatively long, and the varied exposure to weather conditions makes it fairly common for water conditions to be conducive to recreational scuba diving at some part of the city's coast. There is considerable variation in the underwater environment and regional ecology as there are dive sites on reefs and wrecks on both sides of the Cape Peninsula and False Bay, split between two coastal marine ecoregions by the Cape Peninsula, and also variable by depth zone.

False Bay is open to the south, and the prevailing open ocean swell arrives from the southwest, so the exposure varies considerably around the coastline. The inshore bathymetry near Cape Point is shallow enough for a moderate amount of refraction of long period swell, but deep enough to have less effect on short period swell, and acts as a filter to pass mainly the longer swell components to the Western shores, although they are significantly attenuated. The eastern shores get more of the open ocean spectrum, and this results in very different swell conditions between the two sides at any given time. The fetch is generally too short for southeasterly winds to produce good surf. There are more than 20 named breaks in False Bay. The north-wester can have a long fetch and can produce large waves, but they may also be associated with local wind and be very poorly sorted. The Atlantic coast is exposed to the full power of the South-westerly swell produced by the westerly winds of the southern ocean, often a long way away, so the swell has time to separate into similar wavelengths, and there are some world class big wave breaks among the named breaks of the Atlantic shore.

See also

References

External links

Largest online collection of photos/Videos of the past by HiltonT on Flicker
Largest online collection of photos/Videos of the past by Etienne du Plessis on Flicker
Cape Town Historic Society (Many photos into past of what things used look like)
Cape To Durban, how British (1820 Settlers) explorered), (Many photos into past of what things used look like)
Cape Town (Cape of Good Hope) – (Unofficial Index to all resource on the net) The history occurring on its land Relevant Reading Material
Building of all South African Railways into the interior of the Country – Video
British Rolay Rolay Tour of South Africa Uncut – Video

Official website of the City of Cape Town
Official website of the Western Cape
Official Cape Town Tourism website
Cape Town Tourism Guide website

7 Breathtaking Beaches In Cape Town

 
Capitals in Africa
Cities in South Africa
Populated coastal places in South Africa
17th-century establishments in the Cape Colony
1652 establishments in Africa
1652 establishments in the Dutch Empire
Populated places established in 1652
Populated places established by the Dutch East India Company
Populated places in the City of Cape Town
Port cities and towns of the Atlantic Ocean
Port cities in South Africa
Provincial capitals in South Africa